The Lebanon Community School Corporation governs education in the areas surrounding the city of Lebanon, Indiana, the county seat in Boone County, Indiana.

The Corporation is run by a five-member school board who appoints a superintendent to administer the Corporation's day-to-day affairs.

The school board has final say in all hiring and other activities throughout the six school district.

District Snapshot
Students: 3,549
Ethnicity: 96% White, 2% Multiracial, 2% Hispanic
Teachers:
Avg. Teacher Salary: $47,800
Avg. Teacher Age: 43 years

Schools
Elementary Schools: Harney Elementary, Hattie B. Stokes Elementary, Central Elementary, and Perry Worth Elementary
Middle School: Lebanon Middle School
High school: Lebanon Sr. High School

Lebanon Senior High School
Students: 1,024
Principal: Mr. Kevin O'Rourke
Asst. Principals: Mrs. Dickerson, Mr. Gee, Mr. Reynolds
Teachers: 61
Average Salary: 
Average Age: 42 years
Ethnicity: 98% White, 1.5% Hispanic, .5% Multiracial

Lebanon Middle School
Students: 826
Principal: Mr. Doyle Dunshee
Assistant Principal:  Mr. Mark Butler
Dean of Students:  Mr. Jim McCune
Teachers: 45
Average Salary: $49,093
Average Age: 45 years
Student Ethnicity: 96% White, 2% Multiracial, 1% Hispanic, 1% Native American

Elementary schools
Hattie B. Stokes: 540 students
Harney: 453 students
Central: 378 students
Perry Worth: 328 students

Administration and School Board
School Board Members: Michael Burtron (President), Michele Thomas (Vice President), Elizabeth Keith (Secretary), Tom Merritt, and David Herr
Administration
Superintendent: Dr. Robert Taylor 
Business Manager: Mr. Charles Tait
Executive Director of Resources and Operations: Mr. Bob Ross
Director of Curriculum: Mrs. Diane Scott

Famous graduates

Craig Terrill, defensive tackle for the Seattle Seahawks and Rick Mount, named Indiana's Mr. Basketball in 1966 are two notable graduates.
Also, parts of the Academy Award-nominated movie Hoosiers were filmed in the old Lebanon Senior High School building now called Memory Hall. John Cougar Mellencamp, an Indiana native, recently filmed a commercial in Memory Hall, now owned by a fitness gym but restored to its original condition with the addition of a mural.

School districts in Indiana
Education in Boone County, Indiana